The Rhodes Memorial on Devil's Peak in Cape Town, South Africa, is a memorial to the English-born South African politician Cecil John Rhodes (1853–1902). The memorial was designed by the renowned architect, Sir Herbert Baker.

Location
The memorial is situated at Rhodes's favourite spot on the lower slopes of Devil's Peak. Rhodes's own wooden bench is still situated below the memorial. The view facing north-east can be imagined as the start of the Cape to Cairo Road and Rhodes's dream of a "red line" of British dominions spanning the continents north to its south.

Rhodes owned vast areas of the lower slopes of Table Mountain, most of which he gave to the nation on his death. Part of his estate was used for the University of Cape Town upper campus, part is now the Kirstenbosch National Botanical Garden, while much else of it was spared from development.

Architecture

The architect, Sir Herbert Baker, allegedly modelled the memorial after the Greek temple at Segesta although it is actually closer to the temple of Pergamon in design. It consists of a massive staircase with 49 steps (one for each year of Rhodes's life) leading from a semi-circular terrace up to a rectangular U-shaped monument formed of pillars. The memorial is built of Cape granite quarried on Table Mountain.

At the bottom of the steps is a bronze statue of a horseman, Physical Energy by George Frederic Watts. Eight bronze lions by John Macallan Swan flank the steps leading up to the memorial, with a bust of Rhodes (also by JM Swan). The inscription on the monument is "To the spirit and life work of Cecil John Rhodes who loved and served South Africa."  Inscribed below the bust of Rhodes are the last four lines of the last stanza from the 1902 poem Burial by Rudyard Kipling in honour of Rhodes:

 The immense and brooding spirit still
 Shall quicken and control.
 Living he was the land, and dead,
 His soul shall be her soul!

The monument was completed and dedicated in 1912. A memorial proposed by the Colonial Secretary Earl Grey never materialised: a massive "colossus of Rhodes" statue overlooking Cape Town from the summit of Lion's Head, rather like the statue of Christ overlooking Rio de Janeiro.

Outdoor activities
Today the memorial is part of the Table Mountain National Park. There is a well-known tea room behind the memorial, and it is a popular viewpoint and picnicking spot which is frequented by students from the University of Cape Town (UCT) as well as Cape Town residents and also tourists. It is also a starting point for walking and hiking on Devil's Peak. Around the memorial are groves of oaks and stone pines from Europe, and there are also a few remaining pockets of the original Afromontane forest nearby. Just up the slope from Rhodes Memorial there is a small forest of a famous native tree called the Silvertree. Table Mountain is possibly the only place on earth where this majestic tree grows wild and Rhodes Memorial has one of the last surviving stands.

Alien fallow deer used to live in the area, although they are now being eliminated to make way for the re-introduction of indigenous antelope species. Below the memorial is a game enclosure where eland, zebra and wildebeest are kept.

Rhodes Memorial is not generally used for events but does host occasional performances, an annual Easter sunrise service, and is often used as a location for filming. For safety reasons, the area is closed from sunset to sunrise.

The area around the memorial
Not far below the memorial are the University of Cape Town (UCT), Groote Schuur Hospital and Mostert's Mill. Above the memorial is the King's Blockhouse, and not far away is the Groote Schuur Zoo site, originally established as Rhodes's private zoo. The zoo was closed in the late 1970s, and only the lion's den now remains. Rhodes's Groote Schuur estate nearby is now a South African presidential residence.

A statue of Rhodes was situated on the UCT campus, on the lower part of Sarah Baartman Hall steps overlooking the university's rugby fields. This statue had become the focus of protests in March 2015 calling for its removal. It has now been permanently removed.

The area around the memorial was affected by the Table Mountain fire in 2021, and the visitor's cafe was burnt down.

Vandalism  

In September 2015, the bronze bust of Rhodes at the memorial was vandalised. The nose was cut off and the memorial was daubed with graffiti accusing Rhodes of being a "Racist, thief, [and] murderer." It appeared that the vandals had attempted to cut off the whole head. The nose was later restored by a local artist and historian. In July 2020, the bust was decapitated. The head was recovered nearby and reattached on Heritage Day later that year.

Controversy of the memorial  
The Rhodes Memorial is in post-Apartheid South Africa a controversial site due to the political impact Cecil Rhodes historically had in the formation of an inequal system.

Some are of the opinion that colonialism and apartheid are part of the history of South Africa and that the Rhodes Memorial therefore is appropriate. Another view on the matter is that, due to the impact the colonialism has had on forming the inequal society that is South Africa today, these kinds of memorials are inappropriate. There are also several other movements ongoing that are addressing issues on this topic, like discussions about monuments and statues in the UK and Europe that promoted colonialism and imperialism, and the Black Life Matters movement.

Another point of view in this debate accepts the problematic signal that these kinds of monuments hold but argues that keeping them in the public light is preferable so that they can be critically interrogated on a regular basis.

The controversy around Cecil Rhodes monuments was addressed by the Rhodes Must Fall movement, a series of student protests, that eventually lead to the removal of the statue of Cecil Rhodes at the University of Cape Town campus. Many of the same arguments are brought up in the discussion of the memorial, as well as for other monuments and statues of Rhodes in Southern Africa.  These point at how the letting such memorials stay in the public space gives significance to, and continues the promotions of, the ideas that Rhodes him selves promoted, like the elitism of the white population and the economical and geographical distribution and ownership. The students of South Africa, through the Rhodes Must Fall movement, expressed how they did not accept the insensitivities that these kind of monuments gives presence to.

The issue of symbolic representation in the South African context is an important topic in the decolonial and post-apartheid society. With Rhodes using his political power to re-distribute land from black Africans through the Glen Grey Act and at the same time increasing the limit of economic wealth needed for having the right to vote though the Franchise and Ballot Act, he was a large contributor to the inequality that sill perpetuates the South African country today. These political decisions were made in the Parliament of Cape, and therefore the Rhodes Memorial, and other monuments in the area, is a constant reminder of the sort of power that was being performed in Cape Town at the time. 

Currently there are efforts to transform the society of South Africa to make up for some of the inequal politics that the apartheid regime and colonialism has inflicted upon the country, like the land reform. The controversies around monuments like this symbolic representation of Rhodes power reflects the question concerning if there is need for recognition and erasure of the same historical political power on a symbolic level, as well as in the politics of the rights themselves.

The vandalism on the memorial in 2015 and 2020 is thought to be a result of the controversy and protests against legacies of colonialism and imperialism.

References

External links

 Photograph of Rhodes Memorial during construction

Buildings and structures completed in 1912
Monuments and memorials in South Africa
British Empire
Herbert Baker buildings and structures
Tourist attractions in Cape Town
Buildings and structures in Cape Town
Articles containing video clips
1912 establishments in South Africa
Cultural depictions of Cecil Rhodes
Vandalized works of art
20th-century architecture in South Africa